Sakala County (Estonian: Sakala, Latin: Saccalia) was an ancient Estonian county  that was first mentioned in print by Henry of Latvia in the early 13th century.

Geography
Sakala County is in northwestern Livonia, covering approximately the present counties of Viljandi, the southern half of Pärnu and the western third of Valga County. It was the southernmost of the ancient Estonian counties.

History
According to one hypothesis, the tribe of Sosols mentioned in Old East Slavic chronicles implies the people of Sakala. The chronicles say that Kievan Rus organized military campaign against Sosols in 1060 and taxed them. A year later, Sosols rose, destroyed Kievan Rus fort in Tartu and attacked Pskov.

After the Livonian Crusade, the county became a part of the Livonian Confederation.

In Sackalian folklore, the neighbouring Ugaunians (ugalased) were enemy warriors and robbers.
For instance, a folk song from Viljandi, the capital of Sackalia, calls for speeding up the harvest work because the Ugaunians might attack.

See also 
List of Estonian rulers

References

Ancient counties of Estonia
Viljandi County
Pärnu County
Valga County